Grigory Yevseyevich Zinoviev (born Ovsei-Gershon Aronovich Radomyslsky,  – 25 August 1936) was a Soviet revolutionary and politician. He was an Old Bolshevik and a close associate of Vladimir Lenin. During the 1920s, Zinoviev was one of the most influential figures in the Soviet leadership and the chairman of the Communist International.

Born in Ukraine to a Jewish family, Zinoviev began revolutionary activities by joining the underground Russian Social Democratic Labour Party (RSDLP) in 1901. In 1903 the RSDLP split between the Menshevik faction led by Julius Martov and the Bolsheviks led by Vladimir Lenin. Zinoviev joined Lenin's faction and in doing so he became one of the original Bolsheviks. As a Bolshevik, Zinoviev engaged in revolutionary activities both in Russia and abroad and became known for his fierce loyalty to Lenin. 

The Bolsheviks seized power following the October Revolution in 1917 and established their own government, the Russian Soviet Federative Socialist Republic. This seizure of power ultimately led to the Russian Civil War. Communist parties across Europe, galvanized by WWI and the October Revolution attempted to replicate Bolshevik successes in their respective countries. Demands for supplies and aid goaded Lenin into creating the Communist International in 1919, to distribute aid to these fledgling communist movements. The Communist International, led by Zinoviev, funneled aid and supplies to existing communist parties and sought to create new ones.   

Zinoviev's efforts to mobilize communist revolution abroad ended in failure and he quickly developed a negative reputation in the international eye. Prior to the 1924 Parliamentary election, Zinoviev allegedly authored a letter that claimed the Soviet Union was using the Labour Party to erode British democracy and initiate a communist revolution in the UK. Labour politicians at the time claimed the letter was a forgery, a claim historians would later confirm to be true. Nevertheless, 1924 saw the Conservative Party secure one of the largest electoral successes in the twentieth century.

During Lenin's final illness in 1923–24, Zinoviev allied with fellow Old Bolsheviks Lev Kamenev and Joseph Stalin against Leon Trotsky. The men created a successful triumvirate which denied Trotsky the ability to succeed Lenin and began his downfall. Stalin with the help of Kamenev and Zinoviev removed Trotsky as war minister in 1925. Trotsky was eventually removed from the Central Committee and would be forced into exile in 1929. The defeat of Trotsky marked the end of the coalition between Stalin and Zinoviev. By the mid 1920s, Stalin and Zinoviev entered a feud which resulted in Zinoviev's expulsion from the party in 1925. The two men then reconciled and Zinoviev was eventually reinstated. However, the tumultuous relationship between Stalin and Zinoviev would continue throughout the 1920s and Zinoviev would be expelled from the party three times (in 1927, 1932 and 1934).

Zinoviev's ideological disagreements and troubled relationship with Stalin led him to form a partnership with Leon Trotsky and Lev Kamenev. In 1934, Sergei Kirov, a close ally of Stalin was assassinated. The Soviet investigation that followed concluded that Zinoviev was involved in a conspiracy and plotted to overthrow Stalin. He was subsequently arrested and put on trial in 1936 as a chief defendant in the Trial of the Sixteen. All defendants of the trail were found guilty and subsequently sentenced to death. On August 25, 1936 Grigory Zinoviev alongside Lev Kamenev were executed by the NKVD.

Biography

Before the 1917 Revolution (1901–1917) 

Grigory Zinoviev was born in Yelizavetgrad, Russian Empire (now Kropyvnytskyi, Ukraine), to Jewish dairy farmers, who educated him at home. His name at birth was Ovsei-Gershon Aronovich Radomyslsky (Russian: Овсей-Гершен Аронович Радомысльски), and he was the oldest son born to Aron and Reizy Radomyslsky.  Between 1924 and 1934 the city was known as Zinovyevsk. Grigory Zinoviev was also known in early life under the name Hirsh Apfelbaum. He later adopted several designations, such as Shatski, Grigoriev, Grigori and Zinoviev, by the two last of which he is most frequently called. He studied philosophy, literature and history. He became interested in politics and joined the Russian Social Democratic Labour Party (RSDLP) in 1901. He was a member of its Bolshevik faction from the time of its creation in 1903. Between 1903 and the fall of the Russian Empire in February 1917, he was a leading Bolshevik and one of Vladimir Lenin's closest associates, working both within Russia and abroad as circumstances permitted. He was elected to the RSDLP's Central Committee in 1907 and sided with Lenin in 1908 when the Bolshevik faction split into Lenin's supporters and Alexander Bogdanov's followers. Zinoviev remained Lenin's constant aide-de-camp and representative in various socialist organizations until 1917.

1917 

Zinoviev spent the first three years of World War I in Switzerland. After the Russian monarchy was overthrown during the February Revolution, he returned to Russia in April 1917 in a sealed train with Lenin and other revolutionaries opposed to the war. He remained a part of the Bolshevik leadership throughout most of that year and spent time with Lenin after being forced into hiding in the period following the July Days. However, Zinoviev and Lenin soon had a falling out over Zinoviev's opposition to Lenin's call for an open rebellion against the Provisional Government. On 10 October 1917 (Julian calendar), he and Lev Kamenev were the only two Central Committee members to vote against an armed revolt. Their publication of an open letter opposing the use of force enraged Lenin, who demanded their expulsion from the party.

On 29 October 1917 (Julian calendar), immediately after the Bolshevik seizure of power during the October Revolution, the executive committee of the national railroad labour union, Vikzhel, threatened a national strike unless the Bolsheviks shared power with other socialist parties and dropped Lenin and Leon Trotsky from the government. Zinoviev, Kamenev, and their allies in the Bolshevik Central Committee argued that the Bolsheviks had no choice but to start negotiations since a railroad strike would cripple their government's ability to fight the forces that were still loyal to the overthrown Provisional Government. Although Zinoviev and Kamenev briefly had the support of a Central Committee majority and negotiations were started, a quick collapse of the anti-Bolshevik forces outside Petrograd allowed Lenin and Trotsky to convince the Central Committee to abandon the negotiating process. In response, Zinoviev, Kamenev, Alexei Rykov, Vladimir Milyutin, and Victor Nogin resigned from the Central Committee on 4 November 1917 (Julian calendar). The following day, Lenin wrote a proclamation calling Zinoviev and Kamenev "deserters". He never forgot this conflict, eventually making an ambiguous reference to their "October episode" in his Testament.

The Civil War (1918–1920) 

Zinoviev soon returned to the fold and was once again elected to the Central Committee at the VII Party Congress on 8 March 1918. He was put in charge of the Petrograd (Saint Petersburg before 1914, Leningrad 1924–91) city and regional government.

Sometime in 1918, while Ukraine was under German occupation, the rabbis of Odessa ceremonially anathematized (pronounced herem against) Trotsky, Zinoviev, and other  Bolshevik leaders of Jewish descent in the synagogue.

Shortly after the assassination of Petrograd Cheka leader Moisei Uritsky in August 1918 and the commencement of the five year Red Terror period of political repression and mass killings, Zinoviev said: 

He became a non-voting member of the ruling Politburo when it was created after the VIII Congress on 25 March 1919. He also became the Chairman of the Executive Committee of the Comintern when it was created in March 1919. It was in this capacity he presided over the Congress of the Peoples of the East in Baku in September 1920 and gave his famous four-hour speech in German at the Halle congress of the Independent Social Democratic Party of Germany in October 1920.

Zinoviev was responsible for Petrograd's defence during two periods of intense clashes with White forces in 1919. Trotsky, who was in overall charge of the Red Army during the Russian Civil War, thought little of Zinoviev's leadership, which aggravated their strained relationship.

Rise to the top (1921–1923) 

In early 1921, when the Communist Party was split into several factions, and policy disagreements were threatening the unity of the Party, Zinoviev supported Lenin's faction. As a result, Zinoviev was made a full member of the Politburo after the Xth Party Congress on 16 March 1921, while members of other factions, such as Nikolai Krestinsky, were dropped from the Politburo and the Secretariat.

Zinoviev was one of the most influential figures in the Soviet leadership during Lenin's final illness in 1922–23 and immediately after his death in January 1924. He delivered the Central Committee's reports to the XIIth and XIIIth Party Congresses in 1923 and 1924, respectively, something that Lenin had previously done. He was also considered one of the Communist Party's leading theoreticians. One of the main functions of the Comintern was Bolshevization, whereby the proletarian revolution was postponed, and an emphasis was put on unconditional support for the Kremlin's foreign policy. The Comintern closely supervised many national parties, and reorganized them along Soviet lines, with a healthy dose of Soviet political rhetoric as well.

With Stalin and Kamenev against Trotsky (1923–1924) 

During Lenin's final illness, Zinoviev, his close associate Kamenev and Joseph Stalin formed a ruling 'triumvirate' (or 'troika') in the Communist Party, playing a key role in marginalization of Leon Trotsky. The triumvirate carefully managed the intra-party debate and delegate-selection process in autumn 1923, during the run-up to the XIIIth Party Conference, and secured the vast majority of the seats. The Conference, held in January 1924 just before Lenin's death, denounced Trotsky and Trotskyism. Some of Trotsky's supporters suffered demotion or reassignment in the wake of his defeat, and Zinoviev's power and influence seemed at its zenith. However, as subsequent events showed, his real power base was limited to the Petrograd/Leningrad Party organization, while the rest of the Communist Party apparatus came increasingly under Stalin's control.

After Trotsky's defeat at the XIIIth Conference, tensions between Zinoviev and Kamenev, on the one hand, and Stalin on the other became more pronounced and threatened to end their alliance. Nevertheless, Zinoviev and Kamenev helped Stalin retain his position as General Secretary of the Central Committee at the XIIIth Party Congress in May–June 1924 during the first Lenin's Testament controversy.

After a brief lull in the summer of 1924, Trotsky published Lessons of October, an extensive summary of the events of 1917. In the article, Trotsky described Zinoviev's and Kamenev's opposition to the Bolshevik seizure of power in 1917, something that the two would have preferred left unmentioned. This started a new round of intra-party struggle, with Zinoviev and Kamenev once again allied with Stalin against Trotsky. They and their supporters accused Trotsky of various mistakes and worse during the Russian Civil War. They damaged his military reputation so much that he was forced to resign as People's Commissar of Army and Fleet Affairs and Chairman of the Revolutionary Military Council in January 1925. Zinoviev demanded Trotsky's expulsion from the Communist Party, but Stalin refused to go along at that time and skillfully played the role of a moderate.

Break with Stalin (1925) 

With Trotsky finally on the sidelines, the Zinoviev-Kamenev-Stalin triumvirate began to crumble early in 1925. The two sides spent most of the year lining up support behind the scenes. Stalin struck an alliance with a Communist Party theoretician and Pravda editor Nikolai Bukharin and Soviet prime minister Alexei Rykov. Zinoviev and Kamenev allied with Lenin's widow, Nadezhda Krupskaya, and Grigory Sokolnikov, the Soviet Commissar of Finance and a non-voting Politburo member. The struggle became open at the September 1925 meeting of the Central Committee and came to a head at the XIVth Party Congress in December 1925. With only the Leningrad delegation behind them, Zinoviev and Kamenev found themselves in a tiny minority and were soundly defeated. Zinoviev was re-elected to the Politburo, but his ally Kamenev was demoted from a full member to a non-voting member and Sokolnikov was dropped altogether, while Stalin had more of his allies elected to the Politburo. Within weeks of the Congress, Stalin wrested control of the Leningrad party organization and government from Zinoviev and had him dismissed from all regional posts, leaving only the Comintern as a possible power base for Zinoviev.

With Trotsky and Kamenev against Stalin (1926–1927) 

During a lull in the intra-party fighting in the spring of 1926, Zinoviev, Kamenev and their supporters gravitated closer to Trotsky's supporters and the two groups soon formed an alliance, which also incorporated some smaller opposition groups within the Communist Party. The alliance became known as the United Opposition. In May 1926, Stalin, weighing his options in a letter to Vyacheslav Molotov, directed his supporters to concentrate their attacks on Zinoviev since the latter was intimately familiar with Stalin's methods from their time together in the triumvirate. Following Stalin's orders, his supporters accused Zinoviev of using the Comintern apparatus in support of factional activities (the Lashevich Affair) and Zinoviev was dismissed from the Politburo after a tumultuous Central Committee meeting in July 1926. Soon thereafter the office of the Comintern Chairman was abolished and Zinoviev lost his last important post.

Zinoviev remained in opposition to Stalin throughout 1926 and 1927, resulting in his expulsion from the Central Committee in October 1927. When the United Opposition tried to organize independent demonstrations commemorating the 10th anniversary of the October revolution in November 1927, the demonstrators were dispersed by force and Zinoviev and Trotsky were expelled from the Communist Party on 12 November. Their leading supporters, from Kamenev down, were expelled in December 1927 by the XVth Party Congress, which paved the way for mass expulsions of rank and file oppositionists as well as internal exile of opposition leaders in early 1928.

Submission to Stalin (1928–1934) 

While Trotsky remained firm in his opposition to Stalin after his expulsion from the Party and subsequent exile, Zinoviev and Kamenev capitulated almost immediately and called on their supporters to follow suit. They wrote open letters acknowledging their mistakes and were readmitted to the Communist Party after a six-month cooling off period. They never regained their Central Committee seats, but they were given mid-level positions within the Soviet bureaucracy. Bukharin, then at the beginning of his short and ill-fated struggle with Stalin, courted Kamenev and, indirectly, Zinoviev during the summer of 1928. This was soon reported to Stalin and used against Bukharin as proof of his factionalism.

After once more admitting their supposed mistakes, they were readmitted to the Party in December 1933. They were forced to make self-flagellating speeches at the XVIIth Party Congress in January 1934, with Stalin parading his erstwhile political opponents, now defeated and outwardly contrite.

Show trials (1935–1936) 

After the murder of Sergei Kirov on 1 December 1934 (which served as one of the triggers for the Great Purge of the Soviet Communist Party), Zinoviev, Kamenev and their closest associates were once again expelled from the party and arrested in December 1934. They were tried in January 1935 and forced to admit "moral complicity" in Kirov's assassination. Zinoviev was sentenced to 10 years in prison and his supporters to various prison terms.

In August 1936, after months of rehearsals in secret police prisons, Zinoviev, Kamenev and 14 others, mostly Old Bolsheviks, were put on trial again. This time, the charges included forming a terrorist organization that supposedly killed Kirov and tried to kill Stalin and other leaders of the Soviet government. This Trial of the Sixteen (or the trial of the "Trotskyite-Zinovievite Terrorist Center") was the first Moscow Show Trial and set the stage for subsequent show trials where Old Bolsheviks confessed to increasingly elaborate and egregious crimes, including espionage, poisoning and sabotage. Zinoviev and the other defendants were found guilty on 24 August 1936.

Before the trial, Zinoviev and Kamenev had agreed to plead guilty to the false charges on the condition that they not be executed, a condition that Stalin accepted, stating "that goes without saying". A few hours after their conviction, Stalin ordered their execution that night. Shortly after midnight, on the morning of 25 August, Zinoviev and Kamenev were executed by firing squad.

Accounts of Zinoviev's execution vary, with some having him beg and plead for his life, prompting the stoic Kamenev to tell Zinoviev to "quiet down and die with dignity". Zinoviev allegedly struggled against the guards escorting him so fiercely that instead of taking him to the appointed execution room, he was simply dragged into a nearby cell and shot there.

Stalin was described to have "laughed immoderately on seeing an imitation of the old Bolshevik leader Grigori Zinoviev being dragged to his execution, making
pleas for mercy with obscenities".

The execution of Zinoviev, Kamenev and their associates was a sensational news event in the USSR and around the world, paving the way for the mass arrests and executions of the Great Purge of 1937–1938. In 1988, during perestroika, Zinoviev and his co-defendants were formally rehabilitated by the Military Collegium of the Supreme Court of the Soviet Union.

"Zinoviev Letter" 

Zinoviev was the alleged author of the "Zinoviev Letter" which caused a sensation in the United Kingdom when published on 25 October 1924, four days before a general election. The letter called on British Communists to prepare for revolution. This document is now generally accepted to have been a fabrication, validating the declaration that Zinoviev made in a letter dated 27 October 1924:

"The letter of 15th September, 1924, which has been attributed to me, is from the first to the last word, a forgery. Let us take the heading. The organisation of which I am the president never describes itself officially as the Executive Committee of the Third Communist International; the official name is Executive Committee of the Communist International. Equally incorrect is the signature, The Chairman of the Presidium. The forger has shown himself to be very stupid in his choice of the date. On the 15th of September, 1924, I was taking a holiday in Kislovodsk, and, therefore, could not have signed any official letter....

It is not difficult to understand why some of the leaders of the Liberal-Conservative bloc had recourse to such methods as the forging of documents. Apparently they seriously thought they would be able, at the last minute before the elections, to create confusion in the ranks of those electors who sincerely sympathise with the Treaty between England and the Soviet Union. It is much more difficult to understand why the English Foreign Office, which is still under the control of the Prime Minister, MacDonald, did not refrain from making use of such a white-guardist forgery."

See also
 Foreign relations of the Soviet Union
 Moscow Trials

Notes

References

Works 

 Boi za Peterburg: Dve Rechi (The Fight for St. Petersburg: Two Speeches). With Leon Trotsky. St. Petersburg: Gosudarstvennoe Izdatel'stvo, 1920.
 Leninizm: Vvedenie i izuchenie Leninizma (Leninism: Introduction to the Study of Leninism). Leningrad: Gosudarstvennoe Izdatel'stvo, 1925.

Further reading

 Corney, Frederick C. (ed.), Trotsky's Challenge: The "Literary Discussion" of 1924 and the Fight for the Bolshevik Revolution. [2016] Chicago: Haymarket Books, 2017.
 McDermott, Kevin, and Jeremy Agnew. The Comintern: a history of international communism from Lenin to Stalin (Macmillan International Higher Education, 1996).

External links 
 

Grigory Zinoviev Archive, part of Marxists Internet Archive.
Anatol Lunacharsky on Zinoviev.
Leon Trotsky on Zinoviev and Lev Kamenev

1883 births
1936 deaths
Politicians from Kropyvnytskyi
People from Yelisavetgradsky Uyezd
Ukrainian Jews
Jewish Soviet politicians
Russian Social Democratic Labour Party members
Old Bolsheviks
Politburo of the Central Committee of the Communist Party of the Soviet Union members
Left Opposition
Expelled members of the Communist Party of the Soviet Union
Russian Constituent Assembly members
Comintern people
Jewish socialists
People excommunicated by synagogues
Trial of the Sixteen (Great Purge)
Great Purge victims from Ukraine
Jews executed by the Soviet Union
People executed by the Soviet Union by firearm
Soviet rehabilitations
Residents of the Benois House